Junction Road is a road in Kowloon, Hong Kong which runs between Kowloon City and Kowloon Tong.

History
The streets in Kowloon City, including Junction Road, were laid out in the late 1920s and early 1930s. However, at this stage, Junction Road only extended a short distance from Prince Edward Road. By 1960, Junction Road had been extended as far as Dumbarton Road and during the 1960s, it was extended through Lok Fu to Waterloo Road.

As a child Bruce Lee was in a gang called the Junction Street Eight Tigers.

Location
Junction Road runs north–south connecting Waterloo Road and Prince Edward Road West. At a length of 1600 metres, it runs through the areas of Kowloon Tong, Kowloon Tsai, Lok Fu and Kowloon City.

Features
Features from north to south include:
 Kowloon East Barracks
 Junction Road Park
 Lok Fu Park
 Lok Fu Estate
 Bishop Walsh Primary School (#150)
 Chinese Christian Cemetery
 Arts & Technology Education Centre
 HKICC Lee Shau Kee School of Creativity
 Mei Tung Estate (Mei Yan House)
 Hau Wong Temple, at the junction with Tung Tau Tsuen Road. Built around 1730.
 Munsang College
 Carpenter Road Park
 Holy Family Canossian School

References

Kowloon City
Kowloon Tong
Kowloon Tsai
Lok Fu
Roads in New Kowloon